Cernobbio is a comune (municipality) in the province of Como, Lombardy, northern Italy.

Cernobbio borders the following municipalities: Blevio, Breggia (Switzerland), Como, Maslianico, Moltrasio, Vacallo (Switzerland).

Cernobbio received the honorary title of city with a presidential decree on May 24, 2005.

Events

Since 1975, every year in early September the city of Cernobbio hosts the Ambrosetti Forum, an international economic conference.

Transport and tourism
Cernobbio is a stopping point on the bus and ferry services that link Como to Colico via the west side of Lake Como.  It is the starting point for the long-distance footpath La Via dei Monti Lariani.

See also
 Villa Erba
 Villa d'Este (Cernobbio)
 Concorso d'Eleganza Villa d'Este
 Ambrosetti Forum
 La Via dei Monti Lariani
 RIO Models

References

External links
 Official website